Vissim may refer to:

 VisSim, a visual block diagram language for model based simulation and embedded development. It is developed by Visual Solutions in Massachusetts.
 PTV VISSIM, a microscopic simulation program for multi-modal traffic flow modeling. It is developed by PTV AG in Germany.